Paralympic judo has been contested at the Summer Paralympic Games since 1988. The sport is restricted to visually impaired competitors. Men's and women's events are held in various weight classes, just like judo at the Summer Olympics. More than 130 visually impaired judokas, including some from the United States, Canada, France, Germany, Greece, Spain and Sweden, competed in the Rio 2016 games, making it the biggest yet staged.

Summary

Medal table 
Updated to 2020 Summer Paralympics

Nations

See also
 Judo at the Summer Olympics

 
Paralympic Games
Judo
Paralympics